Thomas Henry Anderson (June 6, 1848 – October 1, 1916) was an Associate Justice of the Supreme Court of the District of Columbia.

Education and career

Anderson was born in Belmont County, Ohio, and attended Mount Union College. He was a high school principal in Cambridge, Ohio in 1871. He was in private practice of law in Cambridge from 1871 to 1889 and in Washington, D.C. from 1893 to 1899, interrupted by a stint as the United States Envoy Extraordinary and Minister Plenipotentiary to Bolivia from 1889 to 1893. He served as the United States Attorney for the District of Columbia from 1899 to 1901.

Federal judicial service

Anderson received a recess appointment from President William McKinley on April 23, 1901, to an Associate Justice seat on the Supreme Court of the District of Columbia (now the United States District Court for the District of Columbia) vacated by Associate Justice Charles Cleaves Cole. He was nominated to the same position by President Theodore Roosevelt on December 5, 1901. He was confirmed by the United States Senate on February 4, 1902, and received his commission on February 6, 1902. His service terminated on October 1, 1916, due to his death.

References

Sources
 

1848 births
1916 deaths
Judges of the United States District Court for the District of Columbia
United States federal judges appointed by William McKinley
United States federal judges appointed by Theodore Roosevelt
University of Mount Union alumni
Ambassadors of the United States to Bolivia
United States Attorneys for the District of Columbia
People from Belmont County, Ohio
19th-century American diplomats
Ohio lawyers
19th-century American politicians